Thomas Ackerley (born 1 January 1990) is a British film producer, actor, and former assistant director. He co-founded the production company LuckyChap Entertainment with his wife Margot Robbie. Together they have produced several films and television series, including the Academy Award-nominated films I, Tonya (2017) and Promising Young Woman (2020).

Early life
Ackerley was born on 1 January 1990 in Surrey. The youngest of three brothers, he grew up in Guildford, England, and attended Godalming College.

Career
Ackerley began his film career as an extra in the first three installments of the Harry Potter film series. After taking a break from films, Ackerley returned to the industry as a production runner for films such as Gambit (2012) and Rush (2013). From 2012 till 2016, Ackerley also worked as an assistant director for various different television series and films, including Pride, Suite Française, The Two Faces of January (all released in 2014) and Macbeth (2015).

In 2014, he and his future wife Margot Robbie, alongside their respective childhood friends, Sophia Kerr and Josey McNamara, co-founded the production company LuckyChap Entertainment. The company has produced films such as I, Tonya (2017) and Promising Young Woman (2020).

Personal life
Ackerley met Australian actress Margot Robbie on the set of Suite Française in 2013 and began dating the next year. They married in a private ceremony in Byron Bay, New South Wales in December 2016. As of 2021, they live in Los Angeles.

Filmography

References

External links
 

1990 births
Living people
English expatriates in the United States
English male child actors
People from Surrey
English film producers
People from Guildford